Highway 5 (AR 5, Ark. 5, and Hwy. 5) is a designation for three state highways in Arkansas. The southern segment of  runs from Highway 7 in Hot Springs north to Interstate 430 (I-430) and US Highway 70 (US 70) in Little Rock.

A northern segment of  begins at US Highway 67/US Highway 167 (Future Interstate 57) in Cabot and runs north to Missouri Route 5, including a lengthy overlap with Highway 25 between Heber Springs and Wolf Bayou. A portion of this route is designated as part of the Sylamore Scenic Byway. This segment also contained a former spur route in Mountain Home.

The Main Street Bridge in Little Rock carries a third, unsigned, Highway 5 designation.

All three routes are maintained by the Arkansas Department of Transportation (ArDOT).

Route description

Hot Springs to Little Rock

In the future, Highway 5 will begin at junction US 70 and US 70 Business Route east of Hot Springs. The new extended roadway will be a Two-lane expressway. Currently, Highway 5 begins north of Hot Springs at Highway 7 and runs northeast to Fountain Lake. In the city the highway has a junction with Highway 128 before entering Saline County and Hot Springs Village. Continuing east, Highway 5 serves as the southern terminus for Highway 9 at Crows. Northwest of Benton the highway has a junction with Highway 298 before entering the city and passing several residential subdivisions. Near Saline Memorial Hospital, Highway 5 has a junction with Interstate 30/US Highway 67/US Highway 70 (I-30/US 67/US 70) and Highway 35. Highway 5 continues onto the freeway, beginning an eastbound concurrency toward Little Rock. Highway 35 runs south toward downtown Benton and eventually Sheridan and Monticello.

I-30/US 67/US 70/AR 5 run northeast past the Congo Rd exit before Highway 5 exits onto the frontage road and onto Military Rd, ending the concurrency. The highway passes the Hester-Lenz House, listed on the National Register of Historic Places (NRHP), prior to the Bryant city limits. An intersection with Highway 183 (Reynolds Rd) near the historic Andrew Hunter House gives access to downtown Bryant as well as the freeway. Continuing east, Highway 5 intersects Highway 835 (Woody Dr) which leads to the Alexander branch of the Arkansas Department of Human Services's Youth Service Center, after which it enters Pulaski County.

Highway 5 meets Otter Creek Rd and Highway 338 (Baseline Rd), both collector roads for I-30/US 67/US 70 in southwest Little Rock. Entering a suburban area, Highway 5 crosses I-430, passes the historic Dr. Morgan Smith House, and meets Highway 300 (Colonel Glenn Rd) before terminating at US 70 (University Ave) near the University of Arkansas at Little Rock campus.

Main Street Bridge
The Main Street Bridge in Little Rock carries a hidden AR 5 designation.

Cabot to Heber Springs
AR 5 begins at US 67/167 (Future I-57) south of Cabot and runs north to cross AR 89 and AR 319. The route continues north to meet US 64 south of El Paso and AR 310 near Romance. AR 5 and AR 310 form a concurrency that runs until AR 36 in Rose Bud. AR 5 continues north to Heber Springs, where it begins to concur with AR 16/AR 25.

AR 5 leaves AR 25 near Wolf Bayou, when AR 5 begins to run with AR 87, named Mountain View Road. The two routes meet AR 14 in front of the Stone County Medical Center in south Mountain View. AR 5/AR 14/AR 87 run briefly west to Sylamore Avenue, when they meet AR 9. AR 5/AR 9/AR 14 run north through town to Allison, when AR 5 continues northward alone. Passing through the Ozark National Forest, AR 5 emerges near Calico Rock. The route takes a turn northwest, concurring with AR 177 near Norfork. Entering Mountain Home, AR 5 crosses US 62 southeast of town. AR 5 becomes 9th Street, meeting US 412/US 62 BUS/AR 101 in downtown Mountain Home. The route continues northwest to Midway, after which it heads north to the Missouri state line. AR 5 terminates at Route 5.

Missouri Route 5 runs entirely across Missouri and eventually becomes Iowa Highway 5.

History

Highway 5 was created in 1926 as one of the original numbered state highways in Arkansas. At time of creation, AR 5 did not extend south of Little Rock. The segment between Little Rock and Benton is the former alignment of US 67/US 70 in that area and was re-designated as Highway 5 upon completion of the freeway segment of US 67/US 70 (now I-30) in 1955.

The Arkansas State Highway Commission truncated AR 5 at I-430 and renumbered the remainder of Old Stagecoach Road as US 70 on December 9, 2021 in a deal with the cities of Little Rock, North Little Rock, and Pulaski County to cover the relocation costs for Rock Region Metro as part of the "30 Crossing" project on I-30.

Future
In the future, Highway 5 will be extended and follow the Hot Springs Bypass extension. Highway 5 will begin at junction US 70 and US 70 Business Route east of Hot Springs. It was going to open in fall 2022. The supply chain issue is delaying the project. Issues with a retaining wall is another factor delaying the completion date to May 2023. The new roadway will be a two-lane expressway.

Major intersections

See also

References

External links

005
Transportation in Garland County, Arkansas
Transportation in Saline County, Arkansas
Transportation in Pulaski County, Arkansas
Transportation in Lonoke County, Arkansas
Transportation in White County, Arkansas
Transportation in Cleburne County, Arkansas
Transportation in Stone County, Arkansas
Transportation in Izard County, Arkansas
Transportation in Baxter County, Arkansas
U.S. Route 67
U.S. Route 70